Edward Vaughan may refer to:
Edward Vaughan (archdeacon)
Edward Vaughan (bishop) (died 1522), Welsh bishop of St David's
Edward Vaughan (of Llwydiarth) (died 1661), Welsh MP for Merioneth and Montgomeryshire
Edward Vaughan (died 1683), Welsh lawyer and politician
Edward Vaughan (died 1718), Welsh MP for Merionethshire, 1679–1718
Edward Vaughan (priest) (1776–1849), Anglican priest in India

See also